Eldama Ravine Constituency box number 336-20103 is an electoral constituency in Baringo County, Kenya. It is one of six constituencies in the county and was one of two constituencies of the former Koibatek District. The constituency was established for the 1997 elections.

Wards

Members of Parliament

References 

Constituencies in Baringo County
Constituencies in Rift Valley Province
1997 establishments in Kenya
Constituencies established in 1997